Frank Barger (1921 in China Grove, North Carolina – 1991) was an American high school football coach at Hickory High School in Hickory, North Carolina. A graduate of Lenoir-Rhyne College, Barger compiled a 273–108–5 record coaching the Hickory Tornadoes, including 3 western state titles and 10 district titles during his 31-year tenure (1953–1984).  He was the National Coach of the Year for District 3 (Southeast U.S.) in 1971, and in 1993 was inducted into the North Carolina Sports Hall of Fame, in Raleigh, North Carolina.  During his time at Hickory High School, Barger also coached baseball, golf, track, and girls' basketball.

References

1921 births
1991 deaths
High school baseball coaches in the United States
High school basketball coaches in North Carolina
High school football coaches in North Carolina
Lenoir–Rhyne University alumni
People from China Grove, North Carolina
People from Hickory, North Carolina
Sportspeople from North Carolina
20th-century American people